The 1911 Butler Christians football team represented Butler University as an independent during the 1911 college football season. Butler compiled a record of 3–4–1. Dave Allerdice began the season at the team's head coach, but left Butler after the team's first game in early October to become the head football coach at University of Texas at Austin, succeeding Billy Wasmund, who died as a result of a fall. Walter Gipe coached Butler for the remainder of the season. Butler credits the entire season to Allerdice.

Schedule

References

Butler
Butler Bulldogs football seasons
Butler Christians football